Robin Lod (born 17 April 1993) is a Finnish professional footballer who plays as a midfielder for Major League Soccer club Minnesota United and the Finland national team. Lod was born in Helsinki, Finland. He began his senior club career playing for Klubi 04, before making his league debut for HJK at age 18 in 2011. After winning his first trophy, the Veikkausliiga, during his second season on league level, he helped HJK win three successive Veikkausliiga titles, Cup and League Cup.

Lod made his international debut for Finland in October 2013, at the age of 20 and has since had over 30 caps, including appearing in 2018 FIFA World Cup qualifications.

Club career

HJK
Lod scored his first goal on his senior debut for HJK on 22 October 2011 in a 4−1 home win against MYPA.

During the 2012 season he played for VPS on loan from HJK. Having initially been loaned out on 9 August 2012 until 3 September 2012, the loan was extended subsequently until the end of the season.

After the 2014 season Lod was selected as Player of the Year for Veikkausliiga. Additionally, he was selected as both the best midfield player and the best player of the U21 National Team for the season. Lod featured in 120 games for HJK and netted 21 goals, while also contributing 17 assists.

Panathinaikos
On 6 May 2015, Lod agreed to terms with Panathinaikos to move to the club in the summer transfer window, signing a three-year contract. On 3 October 2015, he made his Superleague Greece debut against Xanthi. On 28 May 2017, he scored in a 1–0 win against Panionios at Leoforos Stadium. Three days later, another goal by Lod helped his club to secure a 3–2 away win against rivals PAOK on the last matchday of the 2016–17 Playoffs depriving PAOK of the possibility to participate in the UEFA Champions League third qualifying round. After the first half of the 2017–18 season, Lod didn’t seem to want to sign a new deal in Greece, and Panathinaikos have financial troubles and could be forced to sell in January transfer window. On 19 February 2018, Panathinaikos finally won away from home in the SuperLeague, defeating AEL 1–0 thanks to a goal from the Finland international midfielder. Lod's goal ended an 11-match run without a victory away from their home stadium. On 10 March 2018, Lod struck a superb late equaliser to salvage a vital point for Panathinaikos against an impressive Asteras Tripolis at the Apostolos Nikolaidis stadium.

Following Lod's contract expiry with Panathinaikos on 30 June 2018, and despite attempts to reach a renewal agreement, the player left the club on a free transfer considering the debt-related limitations imposed on Panathinaikos regarding the transfer and re-signing of players over the age of 23.

Sporting de Gijón
On July 23, 2018 Lod signed with Segunda División team Sporting de Gijon. He made his debut appearance and also scored his first goal for Gijon on 26 August 2018 in a match against Gimnàstic de Tarragona.

Minnesota United FC 
On July 16, 2019, Lod signed with MLS side Minnesota United. On May 22, 2022 With a goal in the 20th minute against Dallas FC Lod scored his 22nd goal for Minnesota United in MLS league play becoming Minnesota United's all time leading scorer during its history in Major League Soccer.

International career
He made his debut for the Finnish national team on 30 October 2013 in a friendly match in Qualcomm Stadium, San Diego against Mexico. On 7 October 2016, Lod scored his first international goal in a 2018 FIFA World Cup preliminary game by giving the lead to Finland before they lost 3–2 in the very last minute against Iceland.

Career statistics

Club

International
Statistics accurate as of match played on 21 June 2021.International goalsAs of match played on 13 November 2021. Finland score listed first, score column indicates score after each Lod goal.''

Honours
Klubi 04
Kakkonen: 2011

HJK Helsinki
Veikkausliiga: 2012, 2013, 2014
Finnish Cup: 2014
Finnish League Cup: 2015

References

External links

 Minnesota United FC official profile
 Panathinaikos F.C. official profile
 Robin Lod – SPL competition record
 
 
 

1993 births
Living people
Footballers from Helsinki
Association football midfielders
Finnish footballers
Finland youth international footballers
Finland under-21 international footballers
Finland international footballers
Klubi 04 players
Helsingin Jalkapalloklubi players
Vaasan Palloseura players
Panathinaikos F.C. players
Sporting de Gijón players
Minnesota United FC players
Veikkausliiga players
Kakkonen players
Super League Greece players
Segunda División players
Major League Soccer players
UEFA Euro 2020 players
Finnish expatriate footballers
Finnish expatriate sportspeople in Greece
Expatriate footballers in Greece
Finnish expatriate sportspeople in Spain
Expatriate footballers in Spain
Finnish expatriate sportspeople in the United States
Expatriate soccer players in the United States
Swedish-speaking Finns